Mariusz Niedbała (born July 4, 1982) is a Polish footballer (midfielder) played in the first round of 2006/2007 season in Unia Janikowo.

Clubs 
 2000-2004  Warta Poznań
 2004-2005  KSZO Ostrowiec Świętokrzyski
 2005-2006  Kania Gostyń
 2006-2007  Unia Janikowo
 2006-2007  Mieszko Gniezno (loan)
 2007-2008  Unia Janikowo
 2008-2009  Sandecja Nowy Sącz- ?

External links
 

1982 births
Living people
People from Milicz
Polish footballers
Warta Poznań players
KSZO Ostrowiec Świętokrzyski players
Kania Gostyń players
Unia Janikowo players
Mieszko Gniezno players
Sandecja Nowy Sącz players
Sportspeople from Lower Silesian Voivodeship
Association football midfielders